This is a List of films about Australian history.

Prior to European settlement 

Ten Canoes (2007)

Early European settlement 

The Birth of White Australia (1928)
Heritage (1935)
Botany Bay (1953)

Convicts 
For the Term of His Natural Life (1927)
Against the Wind (1978) (mini series)

Gold Rush era
Eureka Stockade (1948)
Eureka Stockade (1984) (mini-series)

Bushranger era 
The Story of the Kelly Gang (1906)
Captain Thunderbolt (1953)
various versions of Robbery Under Arms - ones made in 1957
The Proposition (2005)

Up to and around Federation 
Wills and Burke (1985)
Burke and Wills (1985)
The Chant of Jimmie Blacksmith (1978)
Oscar and Lucinda (2000)

Boer War 
'Breaker' Morant (1980)

World War I

Gallipoli Campaign 
The Hero of the Dardanelles (1915)
Murphy of Anzac (1916)
Gallipoli (1981)
Break of Day (1976)

Palestinian Campaign 
Forty Thousand Horsemen (1940)
The Lighthorsemen (1987)

Other theatres 

How we Beat the Emden (1915)

World War II

Australia
The Overlanders (1946)
Australia (2008)

African Campaign 
The Rats of Tobruk (1944) - with final sequences in New Guinea

Pacific War 
Attack Force Z (1981)
Kokoda (2006)

Vietnam War 
The Odd Angry Shot (1979)
Vietnam (1988) - mini series
The Dish (2001)
Dirty Deeds (2002)

History
Films